John Paul's Rock is a novel published in 1932 by Canadian writer Frank Parker Day, about a Mi'kmaq guide who fled into Nova Scotia to escape white man's law.

Overview
The novel was published by Minton, Balch and Company in 1932. It included illustrations by Day's wife, the artist Mabel Killam Day.

Inspiration
Jim Charles, who was the inspiration for the novel, was perhaps the most noted Indian guide in both fact and fiction. His notoriety comes not from his guiding expertise but from his discovery of gold and a subsequent brush with the law which led to his fleeing as a fugitive into the wilds of the interior. In the 1860s he was living in a cabin and tending a few heads of cattle and a horse on the point which today beats his name within the boundaries of Kejimkujik National Park.

References

1932 Canadian novels
Canadian historical novels
Novels set in Nova Scotia
Novels by Frank Parker Day